The Central South African Railways Class E  of 1901 was a South African steam locomotive from the pre-Union era in Transvaal.

In 1901 and 1902, during the Second Boer War, the Imperial Military Railways placed 35 tank locomotives with a  wheel arrangement in service, built to the design of the Reid Tenwheeler of the Natal Government Railways. In 1902, they came onto the roster of the Central South African Railways and were designated Class E.

Origin
When the Natal Government Railways (NGR) identified a requirement for a tank locomotive which could haul at least one-and-a-half times as much as a Dübs A  locomotive, a  tank locomotive was designed by George W. Reid, Locomotive Superintendent of the NGR at the end of the nineteenth century. On the NGR, these locomotives became known as the Reid Tenwheelers, later designated the NGR Class C.

Manufacturers

In 1901, during the Second Boer War, the Imperial Military Railways (IMR) of the invading British forces experienced a shortage of locomotives as a result of damage caused during hostilities and the transportation demands of the British Military. Lieutenant-Colonel E.P.C. Girouard KCMG DSO RE, the Commissioner of Railways for the Transvaal and Orange River Colony, therefore placed urgent orders for 35 locomotives of the NGR's Reid Tenwheeler type.

To ensure rapid delivery, the order was split between Dübs and Company, who built engine numbers 220 to 234, and Neilson, Reid and Company, who built numbers 235 to 254.

Characteristics
To be able to negotiate sharp curves, both the first and fifth pairs of coupled wheels of the Reid Tenwheeler locomotive were flangeless. The locomotive used saturated steam and was equipped with Allan straight link valve gear. The trailing Bissel truck was of the Cartazzi type, which allowed the axle some lateral movement.

The main shortcoming of the Reid Tenwheeler was a tendency to derail while reversing, particularly over points, since the trailing drivers were flangeless.

While the IMR locomotive was identical in construction to those built for the NGR, it had a weatherboard affixed to the coal bunker to offer the crew better protection against the elements when travelling bunker forward. The locomotives were more ornate than those in Natal and, in true military style, their brass domes, chimney caps and boiler bands were polished. The practice of polished brasswork was a trade mark of the IMR and was done with all their new locomotives. It was continued on the Central South African Railways (CSAR) after the IMR was disbanded.

Service

Imperial Military Railways
The Royal Engineer officers of the IMR considered the Reid Tenwheeler as an excellent and handy type of locomotive for the heavy gradients of 1 in 100 (1%) to 1 in 50 (2%). Most of the IMR's Reid Tenwheelers had been in service for less than a year when peace was declared on 1 June 1902. On 1 July 1902, the control of the railways was handed back to civilian authority.

Central South African Railways
The IMR was transformed into the CSAR, who took control of all railways in the Transvaal and the Orange Free State. One of the first steps taken by the CSAR was to classify and renumber all the locomotive stock, with tank locomotives classified alphabetically and tender locomotives numerically. The Reid Tenwheeler engines were designated , but retained their IMR engine numbers.

Rebuilding to 4-8-2T Mountain
From c. 1903, six locomotives, numbers 222, 233 to 235, 245 and 252, were converted to  Mountain type engines by removing the fifth pair of coupled wheels and blanking off the resulting opening in the frame, similar to the modification which was being done by the NGR on its own Reid Tenwheelers to make them better suited for the tight curves encountered on points during yard working.

Rebuilding to 4-8-0TT Mastodon
Since the small coal and water capacity of the Reid Tenwheelers limited their radius of action, one of them was converted to a tank-and-tender configuration in 1904. The coal bunker, trailing bissel truck and the fifth pair of coupled wheels were removed, the frame was shortened and the locomotive was equipped with a tender from an obsolete Cape 4th class locomotive. As a tank-and-tender type, the modified locomotive was able to haul the same load as before, used less oil, was less troublesome and was considered by crews to be much more comfortable. As a result, the remaining 28 unmodified Reid Tenwheelers were similarly modified to the  Mastodon type configuration, using three-axle tenders from CSAR  locomotives.

Both modified versions of the locomotive were not reclassified on the CSAR, but were referred to as the Class E Converted. By 1912, when the classification and renumbering of all the rolling stock of the Cape Government Railways, NGR and CSAR onto the South African Railways roster took place, none of these locomotives survived in their original  Reid Tenwheeler configuration.

Works numbers
The CSAR Class E builders, works numbers, rebuilding and disposition are listed in the table.

References

0480
0480
4-10-2 locomotives
2E1 locomotives
4-10-2T locomotives
Dübs locomotives
Neilson Reid locomotives
Cape gauge railway locomotives
Railway locomotives introduced in 1901
1901 in South Africa
Scrapped locomotives